or  in Spanish or  or  in Basque are different names for the medieval neighbourhood of Bilbao, part of the Ibaiondo district. The names mean Seven Streets or Old Town respectively and it used to be the walled part of the town until the end of the 19th century.

The Seven Streets
The name Zazpikaleak or Las Siete Calles (The Seven Streets) come from the oldest part of the neighbourhood which included exactly 7 streets and some much more narrow alleys connecting them, called cantons (kantoi, cantón). The historical seven streets of Bilbao are:
Somera, "upper"
Artekale, "middle street"
Tendería, "shopkeeper's"
Belostikale, "rapid street"
Carnicería Vieja, "old butchery"
Barrenkale, "lower street"
Barrenkale Barrena, "lower lower street"

The "8th" street is Ronda, which used to be the patrol street outside the walls. Later the town expanded northwards with the construction of the Plaza Berria or Plaza Nueva (new square) and the streets Santa María ("Saint Mary"), Bidebarrieta ("new ways"), Correo ("mail") and Askao. Nowadays the neighbourhood also includes the Ribera ("riverbank") street, the Arenal ("sandy place") Park and Esperanza ("hope") street as well.

The area is served by Casco Viejo station of the Bilbao Metro.

Tourism
The area is probably the most colorful part of Bilbao, including many shops and taverns, several historical churches (San Antón, Santos Juanes, the Cathedral, San Nicolás), a large food retail market ( Mercado de la Ribera ), the public Arriaga Theatre, the seat of the Academy of the Basque Language (Euskaltzaindia), a ball court, and a public library. It is connected to the rest of the city and conurbation by the subway, tramway and buses. Three public elevators also connect Casco Viejo to the neighbourhoods of Begoña and Solokoetxe, which otherwise demand a rather intense uphill walk.

There is a tradition of middle-age men doing a tavern crawl drinking short glasses (chiquitos) of wine and singing choral songs.

Geography of Bilbao
Estuary of Bilbao
Historic districts in Spain